The Samsung Galaxy A10 is an Android smartphone developed by Samsung Electronics. It was released in March 2019. It comes with Android 9 (Pie) with One UI, 32GB internal storage and a 3400 mAh battery. It is the successor of the Galaxy J4/J4+, and is the predecessor to the Galaxy A11.

Specifications

Hardware
The Samsung Galaxy A10 has a 6.2 inch HD+ Infinity-V Display with a 720x1520 resolution. The phone itself measures 155.6 X 75.6 X 7.9mm and weighs 168 g. It is powered by an Octa-core (2x1.6 GHz Cortex-A73 & 6x1.35 GHz Cortex-A53) CPU and a Mali-G71 MP2 GPU. It comes with 32GB internal storage, expandable up to 512GB via MicroSD and 2GB RAM. It has a non-removable 3400 mAh battery.

Software
The Samsung Galaxy A10 runs on Android 9 (Pie) with Samsung's signature One UI. In May 2020, it received an Android 10 update, along with OneUI 2.0 and in August 2021,  it was upgraded to Android 11.That was the last major update this phone received.

See also
Samsung Galaxy
Samsung Galaxy A series
Samsung Galaxy A50

References

Samsung Galaxy
Mobile phones introduced in 2019
Android (operating system) devices
Samsung mobile phones